Aino Yamada (born 10 March 2003) is a Japanese rhythmic gymnast. She represented her country at the 2018 Youth Olympics.

Personal life 
She took up rhythmic gymnastics because she liked that the sport allowed her to express herself through her body movements, she also enjoyed the different characteristics of each of the four pieces of apparatus. Outside of the gym she enjoys hot springs and saunas. Her dream is to compete at the 2024 Olympic Games like her idol Melitina Staniouta did. She's studying at the Kokushikan University in Tokyo.

Career

Junior 
Yamada debuted at the 2016 Asian Championships in Tashkent where she won a bronze medal in teams along Sumire Kita, Chisaki Oiwa and Karin Koike.

In 2017 she was again selected for the Asian Championships, she ended 3rd in the All-Around and won bronze in the hoop final behind Adilya Tlekenova and Takhmina Ikromova.

She was included in the team that represented Japan at these championships in 2018 where, by qualifying in 2nd place in the All-Around, she made it into the top 7 that qualified for the 2018 Youth Olympics. In October she took part in the competition in Buenos Aires, finishing 6th in qualification and 8th in the final.

Senior 
Even if Aino became a senior in 2019 she made her breakthrough in 2022, when she debuted at the World Cup in Sofia finishing 25th in the All-Around, 20th with hoop, 26th with ball, 24th with clubs and 31st with ribbon. Then she competed in Baku ending 32nd in the All-Around, 36th with hoop, 29th with ball, 34th with clubs and 24th with ribbon. In August she took part in the last World Cup of the season in Cluj-Napoca, taking 20th place in the All-Around. 26th with hoop, 30th with ball, 12th with clubs and 14th with ribbon. In September Yamada was selected for her maiden World Championships in Sofia along Sumire Kita and the senior group, she ended 33rd in the All-Around, 31st with hoop, 38th with ball, 46th with clubs, 26th with ribbon.

References 

2003 births
Living people
Japanese rhythmic gymnasts
Gymnasts at the 2018 Summer Youth Olympics